The Dove's Lost Necklace is a 1994 French/Tunisian drama film directed by Nacer Khemir. It is the second film in Khemir's Desert Trilogy.

Plot 
The movie is set in Medieval Spain. Hassan a student of calligraphy in 11th Century Andalucía. Being the naïve young student he is, Hassan seeks love through books and poetry. He comes across a fragment of a page from a book of poems, and becomes obsessed with finding the rest. In his quest to find the lost bits of the manuscripts, Hassan acquires the help of child protagonist Zin.

Cast 
 Navin Chowdhry - Hassan
 Walid Arakji - Zin
 Ninar Esber - Aziz
 Noureddine Kasbaoui - Calligrapher
 Jamil Joudi - Giaffar
 Sonia Hochlaff

External links 

1994 drama films
1994 films

References